The Army Special Forces Command ( - COMFOSE) in Pisa is a brigade-level command of the Italian Army, which is responsible for the training, preparation, doctrinal and procedural development, and the materiel acquisition of the army's special forces and special operation forces. Operationally the units of the Army Special Forces Command fall under the Joint Special Forces Operations Command ( - COFS). The command was activated on 19 September 2014 in Pisa.

Structure 
As of September 2020 the command is organized as follows:

  Army Special Forces Command, at Camp Darby (Tuscany)
  4th Alpini Paratroopers Regiment, in Montorio Veronese (Veneto)
 Alpini Paratroopers Battalion "Monte Cervino"
 Operational Support Battalion "Intra"
  9th Paratroopers Assault Regiment "Col Moschin", at Camp Darby (Tuscany)
 Raiders Battalion
 Operational Support Battalion
 Raiders Training Unit
  185th Paratroopers Reconnaissance Target Acquisition Regiment "Folgore", in Livorno (Tuscany)
 3rd Target Acquirers Battalion "Poggio Rusco"
 Operational Support Battalion
 Special Operations Support Unit, at Camp Darby
 Command and Logistic Support Company
 Signal Company
 Special Operations Training Center, at Camp Darby
 1st Basic Training Company
 2nd Advanced Training Company

The units of the Command are supported by the Army Aviation Brigade's 3rd Special Operations Helicopter Regiment "Aldebaran".

Gorget patches 

The personnel of the command's units wears the following gorget patches:

References

External links 
 Italian Army Website: Army Special Forces Command

Military units and formations established in 2014
2014 establishments in Italy